U-set may refer to
 Set of uniqueness
 New South Wales U set